The list of ship launches in 2009 includes a chronological list of ships launched in 2009.


References

See also 

2009
Ship launches